Robert Lukins is an Australian writer.

Career 
Lukins' debut novel The Everlasting Sunday was released by UQ Press in 2018 and received favourable reviews in major Australian publications and on Radio National's The Book Show. The book was shortlisted for the New South Wales Premier's Literary Awards for Fiction and the UTS Glenda Adams New Writing Award in the NSW Premier’s Literary Awards 2019 and was longlisted for The Voss Literary Prize and for The ALS Gold Medal for Literature. In January 2020 he was awarded an Australia Council fellowship.

Bibliography

Novels 

 The Everlasting Sunday (UQ Press 2018)
 Loveland (Allen & Unwin 2022)

Awards 

 New South Wales Premier's Literary Awards, shortlist, 2019
 UTS Glenda Adams New Writing Award, shortlist, 2019
 The Voss Literary Prize, longlist, 2019
 ALS (Australian Literature Society), Gold Medal, longlist, 2019
 The Age/Sydney Morning Herald, 2018
 The Australian Book Review, 2018

References

External links 
 Author's website
Publisher's website

21st-century Australian novelists
Year of birth missing (living people)
Living people